Podgredina is a village in the municipality of Cazin, Bosnia and Herzegovina. It is located 921 metres above sea level.

Demographics 
According to the 2013 census, its population was 2,073.

References

Populated places in Cazin